The 1989 Vitosha New Otani Open was a women's tennis tournament played on outdoor clay courts in Sofia, Bulgaria that was part of the Category 1 tier of the 1989 WTA Tour. The tournament was held from 31 July until 6 August 1989. Second-seeded Isabel Cueto won the singles title.

Finals

Singles

 Isabel Cueto defeated  Katerina Maleeva 6–2, 7–6(7–3)
 It was Cueto's 2nd title of the year and the 5th of her career.

Doubles

 Laura Garrone /  Laura Golarsa defeated  Silke Meier /  Elena Pampoulova 6–4, 7–5
 It was Garrone's only title of the year and the 1st of her career. It was Golarsa's only title of the year and the 1st of her career.

External links
 ITF tournament edition details
 Tournament draws

Vitosha New Otani Open
Vitosha New Otani Open
1989 in Bulgarian women's sport
1989 in Bulgarian tennis